"Trippin'" is a song by American R&B girl group Total, released as the first single from their second studio album Kima, Keisha, and Pam (1998). It was also their second release working with production/writing duo Missy Elliott & Timbaland, after What About Us?, although Timbaland this time provided only co-production and instrumentation, with the pair's longtime collaborator Darryl Pearson instead handling main production with Elliott. Elliott was also often given a "featuring" credit (likely to create increased publicity for the track) despite only providing background vocals and spoken word to the song. The track was by far the group's biggest hit, peaking at number seven on the U.S. Billboard Hot 100 and number three on the Hot R&B/Hip-Hop Songs chart.

The song was released with the Puff Daddy, Harve Pierre & Mario Winans Remix as the main version with regard to the single's cover and track listings. This remix featured a re-arranged version of the original lyrics, heavily sampled LL Cool J's "4, 3, 2, 1" and DMX (who also appeared on the sampled track)  provided rap vocals. Both the original version (listed as "PD Mix") and another main remix (a similar, stripped-down version: the "Missy Mix") were also featured. Radio stations and the video however, simply censored the album version/PD Mix and a video for the remix was not shot.

Music video

The music video was directed by Joseph Kahn.

Vocals
Lead Vocals: Pam (First verse, leads 1st singing of the chorus), Keisha (Second verse), Kima (Bridge)

Background Vocals: Pam, Keisha, Kima, Missy Elliott

Track listing
CD Single

 Remix (Featuring DMX)
 PD Mix
 Missy Mix
 Remix Instrumental

12" Vinyl Single

Side 1 Remix (Featuring DMX)
 Club Mix
 Radio Mix
 Acappella
Side 2
 PD Mix
 Missy Mix
 PD Mix: Acappella

Charts

References

1998 singles
Total (group) songs
Missy Elliott songs
Music videos directed by Joseph Kahn
Bad Boy Records singles
Songs written by Sean Combs
Songs written by Missy Elliott
Songs written by Timbaland
Songs written by Mario Winans
Songs written by Darryl Pearson (musician)
1998 songs
Trip hop songs